The 1998 edition of the Campeonato Carioca kicked off on January 25, 1998 and ended on May 17, 1998. It is the official tournament organized by FFERJ (Federação de Futebol do Estado do Rio de Janeiro, or Rio de Janeiro State Football Federation. Only clubs based in the Rio de Janeiro State are allowed to play. Twelve teams contested this edition. Vasco da Gama won the title for the 21st time. no teams were relegated.

System
The tournament was divided in four stages:
 Preliminary tournament: The five teams that had been eliminated in the First and second phases of 1997's championship joined Friburguense, champions of the 1997 Second Level. The teams all played against each other in a double round-robin format, with the best two teams qualifying into the main tournament.
 Taça Guanabara: The teams that had participated in 1997's third phase earned a bye directly to this phase: the 8 clubs all played in single round-robin format against each other.
 Taça Rio: The 8 clubs all played in single round-robin format against each other. 
 Finals:  The Finals would happen in two matches, both played at the Maracanã Stadium, between the champions of the Taças Guanabara and Rio. However, since Vasco da Gama won both tournaments, the finals didn't happen.

Championship

Preliminary phase

Taça Guanabara

Taça Rio

References

Campeonato Carioca seasons
Carioca